Stadion an der Bremer Brücke or Bremer Brücke is a football stadium in the Schinkel district of Osnabrück, Germany. It is used mostly for football matches and is the home stadium of VfL Osnabrück. The stadium currently holds 16,100 people and was opened in 1933.

From the 1970s, the stadium consisted of the Grandstand ("South Stand"), two roofed terraces behind the goals ("East Stand" and "West Stand"), and an uncovered terrace opposing the grandstand ("North Stand"). On 1 April 2008, demolishing works of the very old North Stand started to make way for a modern entirely roofed stand to be built at the site. The new stand was opened in August 2008; however, there has been controversy with a local resident whose property is situated very close to the ground. For this reason, the stand could not be fully completed earlier than 2011. With the construction of the new stand, the overall stadium capacity decreased to 16,667, but seating capacity rose to 6,192.

The name, which can be translated as "Stadium at Bremen Bridge", comes from a neighbouring railway bridge of the Osnabrück–Bremen railway line. In 2004, a local telecommunications company, Osnatel, bought the naming rights for the stadium and it was renamed to "Osnatel Arena". When the contract expired in 2016, the stadium got back its traditional name.

External links
Stadium information

Bremer Brucke
Buildings and structures in Osnabrück
Sports venues in Lower Saxony
VfL Osnabrück
Sports venues completed in 1933
1933 establishments in Germany
UEFA Women's Championship final stadiums